The football tournament at the 1969 Southeast Asian Peninsular Games was held from 6 December to 13 December 1969 in Rangoon, Burma.

Teams

Tournament

Group stage

Group A

Group B

Knockout stage

Semi-finals

Bronze medal match 
No bronze medal match held.

Gold medal match

Winners

Medal winners

Notes

References 
Southeast Asian Peninsular Games 1969 at RSSSF

Southeast
Football at the Southeast Asian Games
1969